KH Besa Famgas  is a team handball club from Peja in western Kosovo. KH BESA Famgas competes in the Kosovar Superliga and Cup, and it is one of the most famous handball clubs with traditional titles and champions .

Crest, colours, supporters

Kits

Titles  

Superliga (Record):
Winners (18): 1996, 1997, 2002, 2003, 2004, 2005, 2006, 2007, 2012, 2014, 2015, 2016, 2017, 2018, 2019, 2020, 2021, 2022

Kosovo Cup (Record):
Winners (14): 1996, 2003, 2005, 2010, 2011, 2012, 2014, 2015, 2016, 2017, 2018, 2020, 2021, 2022

European record

Team

Current squad 

Squad for the 2020/21 season

Goalkeepers
 Mursel Mehmeti
 Arti Luzha 
Wingers
RW
  Arbios Mushkolaj
  Drilon Tahirukaj
LW 
  Dijon Iidriz
  Yll Muqolli
Line players 
  Kastriot Jupa
  Yll Visoka
  Ardit Tafilaj

Back players
LB
  Nikola Prce
  Charalampos Mallios
  Jon Muqolli
CB 
  Egzon Gjuka
RB
  Victor Alonso
  Bujar Ramosaj

References

External links
 

Kosovar handball clubs
Sport in Peja